Nikolay Petrov (born 30 September 1988 in Byala) is a Bulgarian football midfielder.

Career
Petrov joined the newly promoted in V Group team FC Sofia on 19 January 2016, after the new manager Todor Yanchev was hired. The team will eventually change its name to "Tsarsko Selo". In January 2017, Petrov joined Slivnishki Geroy.

In July 2018, Petrov joined Spartak Varna.

References

External links
 

1988 births
Living people
Bulgarian footballers
Bulgaria under-21 international footballers
Association football midfielders
First Professional Football League (Bulgaria) players
Second Professional Football League (Bulgaria) players
PFC Levski Sofia players
PFC Slavia Sofia players
PFC Spartak Varna players
PFC Kaliakra Kavarna players
PFC Svetkavitsa players
FC Etar 1924 Veliko Tarnovo players
PFC Dobrudzha Dobrich players
FC Dunav Ruse players
FC Lokomotiv Gorna Oryahovitsa players
SFC Etar Veliko Tarnovo players
FC Vereya players
FC Tsarsko Selo Sofia players